Logbook of the World (LoTW) is a web-accessed database provided by the American Radio Relay League (ARRL) to implement a contact verification service among amateur radio operators.  Using LoTW, radio amateurs (hams) can claim and verify contacts (QSOs) made with other amateurs, generally for claiming credit for operating awards, such as DXCC.  This kind of verification formerly required exchange of paper QSL cards and submission to ARRL, a slow and somewhat expensive process.  LoTW began operation in 2003.

Confirmation process

The LoTW system emphasizes secure authentication using cryptographic key distribution.  An amateur's computer-based logbook, in ADIF or Cabrillo format, must be "signed" using a key obtained from ARRL.  (Logbook data includes callsigns and locations of stations, contact time, frequency, and operating mode.) ARRL assigns such keys to amateurs who appear in the U.S. FCC licensing database or to non-US amateurs who provide alternate proof of identity.

Once a log file has been signed using ARRL's "TrustedQSL" (or equivalent) program, it is uploaded to the ARRL server and entered in the database.

Log records in the LoTW database are automatically compared so that when a contact at a particular time, operating mode, and frequency band is claimed by both participating amateurs (who both must have submitted their logs), a "QSL" (confirmation) is declared for a later award claim, e.g., for contacts with all U.S. states or 100 different countries. The matching process is blind, meaning that none of the two stations can see pending confirmations for him before he uploads a matching record. The LoTW QSL is purely electronic; there is no paper confirmation.  However, a participant may print out a record of each confirmed contact, complete with its LOTW record number.

A LoTW-registered amateur may log into the LoTW website to view his or her logged QSOs and the verified QSL matches.  When the amateur has a sufficient number of LoTW and/or traditional paper QSLs, he or she may apply for an ARRL award.  As of January 2012, LoTW credit may be used for credit for awards issued by the ARRL and by CQ Magazine. The ARRL does not recognize other web-based QSL systems, such as eQSL, for awards credit.

Statistics

As of (May 26, 2022) the LoTW server provided the following information:

Software

All registered LoTW users have access to the main user data site: lotw.arrl.org. The TrustedQSL software for certificate management and logbook signing is available through the main LoTW information site: www.arrl.org/logbook-of-the-world. Versions of this software are available for many versions of Windows, Macintosh, and Linux operating systems.

Programmers' information and source code are available at trustedqsl.sourceforge.net, in particular the 2001 design specification.

LoTW functions are integrated into a number of amateur radio logging software packages, simplifying the signing and upload process.

References

External links
 eQSL.cc Position on the ARRL Logbook of the World Specification
 LOTW Resources by HB9BZA
 LoTW users group (Facebook)
 ZL2IFB LoTW User Guide

Amateur radio